Koza Wielka  is a village in the administrative district of Gmina Perzów, within Kępno County, Greater Poland Voivodeship, in west-central Poland.

References

Koza Wielka